Kaoota is a rural residential locality in the local government areas (LGA) of Kingborough and Huon Valley in the Hobart and South-east LGA regions of Tasmania. The 2016 census recorded a population of 202 for the state suburb of Kaoota.

History 
Kaoota was gazetted as a locality in 1971. The name is believed to be an Aboriginal word for “dusk”. 

The area was originally settled as a coal mining town.

Geography
Most of the boundaries are survey lines.

Road infrastructure 
Route C621 (Pelverata Road) runs through from north to south-west.

References

Towns in Tasmania
Localities of Kingborough Council
Localities of Huon Valley Council